The 2017 AMA National Speedway Championship Series was staged over four rounds, held at Ventura (June 17), Santa Maria (July 29), Industry (August 12) and Auburn (September 16). It was won by Billy Janniro, who beat Max Ruml and Broc Nicol. It was the eighth title of Janniro's career, and his fifth in-a-row.

Event format 
Over the course of 20 heats, each rider races against every other rider once. The top eight scorers then reach the semi-finals, with first and second in those semi-finals reaching the final. Points are scored for every ride taken, including the semi-finals and final.

Classification

References 

AMA
United States
Speed
Speed